Frederick Carl Bock Jr (January 18, 1918 – August 25, 2000) was a World War II pilot who took part in the atomic bombing of Nagasaki in 1945.

Bock attended the University of Chicago and went on to enroll in a graduate course in philosophy.

Upon the entry of the United States into the Second World War Bock enlisted in the Army Air Force, becoming a pilot.

Bock flew missions from India to China over the Himalayas, a route known as the hump. He also participated in air raids on Japan flown from China.

Nagasaki Atomic Bomb Raid 

On the Nagasaki Raid, Bock flew the B-29 bomber, The Great Artiste, which was used for scientific measurements and photography of the effects caused by the nuclear weapon.

The bomber which actually dropped Fat Man was called Bockscar, an aircraft named for and usually flown by Frederick Bock. The staff was swapped just before the raid, and Major Charles Sweeney piloted Bockscar, which flew with The Great Artiste and another aircraft.

William L. Laurence, a science writer with the New York Times, was civilian observer aboard The Great Artiste. His account of the mission was awarded the 1946 Pulitzer Prize.

In his subsequent book, Dawn Over Zero (Knopf 1946), Laurence describes the scene aboard the B-29;

Post War Career 

After the war Bock returned to Chicago where he earned his PhD in zoology with a specialisation in mathematical statistics and genetics.

Working in Chicago based research laboratories Dr. Bock created algorithms for solving complex problems.

Dr. Bock retired in 1986 from Baxter Travenol Laboratories. It was there he devised a mathematical model for peritoneal dialysis.

A native of Greenville, Michigan, Bock died at his Arizona home in 2000, of cancer.

References

1918 births
2000 deaths
People associated with the atomic bombings of Hiroshima and Nagasaki
United States Army Air Forces pilots of World War II
United States Army Air Forces officers
People from Greenville, Michigan
Military personnel from Michigan